Dorlene Love is a Swedish punk band based in Stockholm. They are known for their music which is a mix of punk and different kinds of folk music from East Europe, the Middle East and North Africa. Dorlene Love started out as a punk band but after having played a lot on the streets, the folk music influences increased. Sometimes they are categorized in the gypsy punk genre. 

Their debut album was released in April 2008 on the Swedish punk label Birdnest Records.

In March 2011 the band was renamed to Crash Nomada.

Discography 
2008 - Exile Deluxe

References

External links 

Official Dorlene Love Site
Dorlene Love at MySpace

Swedish punk rock groups